Union Township is one of twelve townships in Delaware County, Indiana. According to the 2010 census, its population was 2,838 and it contained 1,260 housing units.

History
Felt's Farm and the Mount Zion Methodist Episcopal Church are listed on the National Register of Historic Places.

Geography

Cities and towns
 Eaton

Unincorporated towns
 Shideler
(This list is based on USGS data and may include former settlements.)

Adjacent townships
 Licking Township, Blackford County (north)
 Jackson Township, Blackford County (northeast)
 Niles Township (east)
 Delaware Township (southeast)
 Hamilton Township (south)
 Harrison Township (southwest)
 Washington Township (west)

Major highways
  Indiana State Road 3

Cemeteries
The township contains three cemeteries: Leaird, Mount Zion Church and Union.

References
 United States Census Bureau cartographic boundary files
 U.S. Board on Geographic Names

External links

 Indiana Township Association
 United Township Association of Indiana

Townships in Delaware County, Indiana
Townships in Indiana